The 1976 Tour of the Basque Country was the 16th edition of the Tour of the Basque Country cycle race and was held from 5 April to 9 April 1976. The race started in Iratxe and finished at the Alt de San Martzial in Irun. The race was won by Gianbattista Baronchelli of the Scic team.

General classification

References

1976
Bas